Peter Lindgren (born 1 June 1964) is a former professional tennis player from Sweden.

Biography
Lindgren, a right-handed player born in Stockholm, played on the professional tour in the 1980s. He had a career best ranking of 119 in the world and made his only main draw appearance in a grand slam tournament at the 1988 Wimbledon Championships, losing in the first round to Karel Nováček. His best performance on the Grand Prix circuit was an appearance in the round of 16 at the 1988 U.S. Pro Indoor, which included a 6–1, 6–0 win over fourth seed Eduardo Bengoechea. He also beat top 50 players Ramesh Krishnan and Ulf Stenlund during his career.

References

External links
 
 

1964 births
Living people
Swedish male tennis players
Tennis players from Stockholm